Sennalkudi Narayana Lakshmi (1927 – 20 February 2012) was an Indian actress, who appeared in supporting roles, often playing roles of a mother or grandmother in films. A recipient of the state government's Kalaimamani and Kalaiselvam awards, Lakshmi acted in more than 1,500 films and 6,000 dramas.

Early life
Lakshmi was born to Narayana Thevar as the thirteenth child and left home aged 11 because her six older brothers did not give her the attention she wanted. Her family had to move from their village town of Sennalkudi to Virudhunagar after their father had died and her mother worked at a small hotel and also at the temple to keep the family afloat. Her neighbour, a dancer, helped Lakshmi join a drama troupe and she quickly picked up the steps she was taught and travelled with them from place to place. When the actors reached Raja Mannargudi they left her with a family which put her on a train to Madras and bade farewell. When she was wondering alone, help came in the form of a lorry driver's wife who noticed her and showed her the way to Gemini Studios, which opened its doors to the destitute. It took eight years for her family to find her.

She soon joined the studio staff at a salary of Rs. 150 and then rented a house with four other young girls and hired a cook. Before her film career began, Lakshmi had years of theatre experience, with more than 2,000 plays to her credit. From Ganandesikar's and N. S. Krishnan's theatre troupes to S. V. Sahasranamam's Seva Stage and K. Balachander's Ragini Recreations, Lakshmi trained under stalwarts. Lakshmi acted as a man in many all-woman plays, doing stunts and acrobatics and even fought a leopard as an extra in the MGR film, Baghdad Thirudan. In 1959, she bought her first home in Royapettah on Pachaiappan Nayakkan Road. Three years later, she bought her first car, a Morris Eight.

Career
She started as a group dancer in Chandralekha. Plays and one-scene appearances in films continued until N. S. Krishnan gave her a pivotal role in Nalla Thangai and then her real breakthrough came through Muktha Srinivasan's maiden venture Thamarai Kulam followed by Engal Kula Devi and Naalu Veli Nilam. Nagesh then recommended her to K. Balachander to star in Server Sundaram, after he had been impressed with her performance in the theatre show of the same name, and the film's success prompted more offers for the actress.

Kamal Haasan called her to feature in Thevar Magan while she was taking a break in Puttaparthi and from then until Virumaandi, Lakshmi has been a part of nearly all of Kamal Haasan productions and such was his confidence in her ability that he would ask the assistants to give her the dialogue and move away, confident that she would handle it on her own.

Before her death she was doing a role as Meenakshi's grandmother in the serial "Saravanan Meenakshi" in Vijay TV and also as Thulasi's grand mother in the serial "Thendral" in SunTV .

Personal life
Lakshmi has mentioned that "marriage didn't appeal to her", and that her brothers' grandchildren and their kids are now regulars at her house.

Until the early 2000s, Lakshmi would move around town by driving but was forced to give it up after she broke her leg. On Sunday mornings she would visit Sai Kripa, a free medical centre in Chennai and help the staff.

Death
S. N. Lakshmi died in Chennai on 20 February 2012, aged 85. She had a cardiac arrest in the early hours of 20 February, following which she was rushed to a hospital. However, doctors declared her dead. Her body was kept at her Saligramam residence where film personalities made tributes. Her cremation took place in her native town of Virudhunagar.

Filmography

TV serials

References

External links
 

Tamil actresses
Indian film actresses
Indian television actresses
People from Virudhunagar district
1927 births
Actresses in Tamil cinema
2012 deaths
Actresses from Tamil Nadu
20th-century Indian actresses
21st-century Indian actresses
Tamil television actresses
Actresses in Tamil television